Brown Middle School may refer to the following schools:

Brown Middle School in the El Paso Independent School District in Texas
Herman J.Russell West End Academy, formerly known as Joseph Emerson Brown Middle School, in the Atlanta Public Schools in Georgia
R. A. Brown Middle School in the Hillsboro School District in Oregon
Charles E. Brown Middle School in the Newton Public Schools School District in Massachusetts